Three from the Unemployment Office (German: Drei von der Stempelstelle) is a 1932 German comedy film directed by Eugen Thiele and starring Fritz Kampers, Paul Kemp and Anton Walbrook. The film was shot at the Staaken Studios in Berlin. It premiered on 29 February 1932. The film's title alludes to the 1930 hit The Three from the Filling Station.

Cast
 Fritz Kampers as Fritz Wenneis, Arbeitsloser 
 Paul Kemp as Arthur Jaenicke, Arbeitsloser 
 Anton Walbrook as Max Binder, Arbeitsloser 
 Evelyn Holt as Else, deren Tochter 
 Margarete Kupfer as Mutter Gohlke, Wäscherin 
 Ferdinand von Alten as Kienast, Chef eines Modesalons 
 Helen Schöner as Frau Kienast 
 Margita Alfvén as Die Directrice 
 Marion Moench as Lotte 
 Elsa Wagner as Die Vermieterin 
 Hedwig Wangel as Die Wohlfahrtsdame 
 Hilde Maroff as Laufmädel bei Kienast 
 Arthur Mainzer   
 Julius Brandt  
 Ernst Morgan  
 Carl Peterhans  
 Hans Schüren  
 Antonie Jaeckel

References

Bibliography
 Grange, William. Cultural Chronicle of the Weimar Republic. Scarecrow Press, 2008.
 Klaus, Ulrich J. Deutsche Tonfilme: Jahrgang 1932. Klaus-Archiv, 1988.

External links

1932 films
Films of the Weimar Republic
1932 comedy films
German comedy films
1930s German-language films
German black-and-white films
1930s German films
Films shot at Staaken Studios